Alainaspis platyrhina is an extinct cyathaspidid heterostracan agnathan vertebrate which existed in a marine environment in what is now the Northwest Territories of Canada, during the upper Silurian period. It was first named by David Elliott and David Dineley in 1985, and is placed in the monotypic genus Alainaspis, closely related to Boothiaspis.

References

Cyathaspidida
Silurian jawless fish
Fossil taxa described in 1985
Fossils of Canada
Cyathaspidiformes genera
Paleontology in the Northwest Territories